SS Mona (I) - the first vessel in the Company's history to be so named - was a wooden paddle steamer that was operated by the Isle of Man Steam Packet Company.

Building
John Wood & Co built Mona at Port Glasgow, launching her on 27 July 1831.

Robert Napier and Sons of Glasgow built her engine, which was a side-lever steam engine driving side paddles.

IoMSP career
Mona was the second ship to enter service with the Isle of Man Steam Packet Company. She was hurriedly ordered for the winter service in place of the larger , which was soon considered too valuable to risk in storm conditions.

Mona started on the Company's service to Whitehaven, and then began winter service to Liverpool in October 1832.

Faster than Mona's Isle, she cut the Douglas – Liverpool run to seven hours, and once made passage from Douglas to Whitehaven in four hours and 35 minutes.

Steam tug
Mona was the smallest ship in the IoMSP fleet. After less than 10 years service she was bought by a C Drinkwater, possibly in 1839 when her port of registration was changed from Douglas to Liverpool. The Liverpool Steam Tug Company bought her in 1841 to use as a tug.

In 1852 James Ward, Hugh Sheridan and Charles Flanagan bought her and registered her in Dublin. After the Merchant Shipping Act 1854 was passed, her official number was 13398. She was scrapped in 1864.

References

Bibliography

1831 ships
Ferries of the Isle of Man
Paddle steamers of the United Kingdom
Passenger ships of the Isle of Man
Ships built on the River Clyde
Ships of the Isle of Man Steam Packet Company
Steam tugs